Starkey Hearing Technologies is an American privately owned company based in Eden Prairie, Minnesota that makes hearing aids, and is one of the largest hearing aid manufacturers in the world.  As of 2019, the company had more than 5,000 employees in 24 facilities, serving more than 100 markets worldwide, and is the only American-owned global hearing aid manufacturer.

History

Early years
In 1967, William F. "Bill" Austin started a small hearing aid repair store after dropping out of medical school. In 1970, he purchased an ear mold company called Starkey Labs for $13,000.  Starkey started manufacturing hearing aids, offering the industry's first 90-day trial period.

1980–present
In 1983, the company's sales doubled when Ronald Reagan started wearing its hearing aids while he was president, which caused a manufacturing crisis at the company to meet demand.

Austin has personally assisted five U.S. presidents, two popes, Mother Teresa, Nelson Mandela and other notable leaders with Starkey hearing aids.

In 2015, Austin fired Starkey's then-president, Jerry Ruzicka, along with a handful of senior managers. A year later, in September 2016, federal prosecutors charged Ruzicka and four others with stealing more than $20 million from Starkey and a supplier since 2006. During the trial, Austin, who was not charged, provided false testimony to the court, causing some of his statements to be stricken from the record. In March 2018, Rusicka was found guilty of eight charges, including mail and wire fraud, and in December 2018 was sentenced to seven years in prison. In 2016, the company reported that its business was strong despite the disruption caused by the embezzlement, with sales of $800 million the prior year. A report in the Star Tribune noted that Starkey faced challenges at that time; its number of new patent filings had fallen, it had slipped to second place in sales to the Veteran's Administration, a key market for hearing aid companies, and sales of hearing aids to consumers were shifting more to big box stores such as Costco or proprietary dealerships, but Starkey was committed to selling directly to independent audiologists.

In July 2017, Brandon Sawalich, Austin's stepson who joined Starkey in 1994, was named company president, succeeding Austin, who retained the role of CEO.

In the summer of 2017, Achintya Bhowmik joined the company as Chief Technology Officer (CTO).

According to Forbes, in 1992 Starkey’s sales had reached nearly $200 million; by 2018 sales were an estimated $850 million a year.

Products

Current product line
As of October 2019, the company offers ten different hearing aid devices and several accessories.  The devices include: 
 Hearing & activity tracking
 Smartphone compatible
 Invisible products
 Receiver-in-canal
 Completely-in-canal
 Behind-the-ear-ear
 In-the-canal
 In-the-ear
 Tinnitus relief
 Single-sided hearing

Recent developments and accessories 
In 2014, Starkey introduced Halo, a hearing aid that works with the iPhone and an associated app.
  

In 2016, the company introduced high-tech hearing aids with more powerful processors and software, aimed at aging baby boomers; their marketing emphasized its ability to help its users hear music well.

In 2017, the iQ product family was unveiled. Products in this family deliver pristine audio and exceptional listening clarity.  Muse IQ Rechargeable delivers continuous, stable power to ensure users' hearing aids are always ready for use.

In 2018, the company introduced Livio AI, the world’s first hearing aid with embedded sensors and artificial intelligence. A multi-purpose hearing aid, Livio AI is the first device to track physical activity and cognitive health as measured by hearing aid use. Other features of Livio AI include language translation, fall detection and alerts, tap control, and other features. The product launch also included a new app, the Thrive Hearing Control app, and three new wireless accessories—the Starkey Hearing Technologies TV, the Remote and the Remote Microphone +.

In addition, Starkey offers two accessories for hearing protection: a line of digital hearing aids called SoundGear that enhance sound quality while protecting ears from sudden loud noises and custom-fit earplugs which protect workers and others from unusually loud or noisy environments.

Starkey Hearing Foundation
According to the World Health Organization, as of 2019, approximately 466 million people worldwide, including 34 million children, have disabling hearing loss.  One of WHO's responses has been to build partnerships "to develop strong hearing care programmes."  To address hearing loss facing those in developing nations, in 1984 Austin and his spouse, Tani Austin, founded the Starkey Hearing Foundation.  Together, they have been active in "building sustainable, community-based systems of hearing healthcare around the world to empower local communities and ensure the people helped are able to achieve their full potential in life."  In 2015, Tani Austin was honored at the United Nations by the United States Federation for Middle East Peace as Female Philanthropist of the Year.

To help raise funds, the foundation holds an annual gala that is attended by various celebrities.  As of 2017, the foundation had donated one million hearing aids to those in need around the world.

During the COVID-19 pandemic, Starkey suspended its Hear Now Program and is yet to release a date to resume services.

References

External links
 Official Website

American brands
Companies based in Eden Prairie, Minnesota
Hearing aid manufacturers
Medical and health foundations in the United States
Privately held companies based in Minnesota
Health care companies based in Minnesota
Electronics companies established in 1967
1967 establishments in Minnesota
Health care companies established in 1967